Better Homes was a lifestyle game show that was broadcast on ITV from 4 January 1999 to 1 July 2003 and was presented by Carol Vorderman.

Format
Two houses were renovated for their owners. The one that increased in value after the televised renovation won for the owners an additional £5,000 (or, in the last series, a family holiday).

Transmissions

Better Homes

Specials

Better Gardens

Ratings
Episode Viewing figures from BARB.

Series 1

Series 2

Better Gardens

Series 3

Series 4

Series 5

Series 6

References

External links

1990s British game shows
2000s British game shows
1999 British television series debuts
2003 British television series endings
ITV game shows
Television series by ITV Studios
English-language television shows